The Minister of Defence is an appointment in the Cabinet of Sri Lanka who is responsible for the implementation of the Government of Sri Lankas defence policy and the headquarters of the Sri Lankan Armed Forces. The post was first created in 1947 as Minister of External Affairs and Defence, in 1978 the Ministry of External Affairs and Defence separated into two ministries, the Ministry of Foreign Affairs and the Ministry of Defence. Prior to the separation of the post the Minister of External Affairs and Defence was held by the Prime Minister since 1947, with a Parliamentary Secretary for Defence and External Affairs who was an elected parliamentarian and was the de facto foreign minister.

List of Defence Ministers

See also
 Ministry of Defence
 Ministry of External Affairs and Defence
 Minister for Internal Security (Ceylon)

References

External links
 Government of Sri Lanka
 Ministry of Defence Sri Lanka

 
Defence